The 1903 Iowa gubernatorial election was held on November 3, 1903. Incumbent Republican Albert B. Cummins defeated Democratic nominee J. B. Sullivan with 57.14% of the vote.

General election

Candidates
Major party candidates
Albert B. Cummins, Republican
J. B. Sullivan, Democratic 

Other candidates
John F. Hanson, Prohibition
John M. Work, Socialist
Luman Hamlin Weller, People's

Results

References

1903
Iowa